Jack Astor's Bar and Grill is a chain of 40 restaurants located in Ontario, Quebec, Alberta, Newfoundland and Labrador, Nova Scotia, Canada, and formerly New York in the United States. All locations include a restaurant and bar area. It is corporately owned by Service Inspired Restaurants, which are based out of Burlington, Ontario.

The restaurant used to feature a neon sign with the restaurant name, flashing the "tor'" portion of the word "Astor's". During renovations, the joke was phased out.

The first location opened in St. Catharines, Ontario, in 1990.

See also
List of Canadian restaurant chains

References

External links

 

Restaurant chains in Canada
Regional restaurant chains in the United States
Restaurants established in 1990
Companies based in Burlington, Ontario
1990 establishments in Ontario